Sing, Pray, Love, Vol. 1: Sing is the seventh studio album by American R&B singer-songwriter Kelly Price. It was released on June 3, 2014 through eOne and produced by Anthony "Shep" Crawford, Kelly Price and Phillip "P3" Scott III. The album was preceded by the release of one single "It's My Time."

Promotion
"It's My Time" was released as the lead and only single taken from the album. The song was released to iTunes on February 25, 2014. On May 30, 2014 "It's My Time" debuted at number 5 on the Billboard Adult R&B Songs chart, the following week the song peaked at number 4 on June 7, 2014 and remained on the charts for 13 weeks. On July 5, 2014 the song debuted at number 25 on the Hot R&B Songs chart. On June 28, 2014 the song debuted at number 23 on the R&B/Hip-Hop Airplay chart, the following week the song peaked at number 22 and remained on the charts for 14 weeks. On June 17, 2014 a new version of the song was released to iTunes "It's My Time (Mike Cruz EDM Mix)".

Critical reception
Melody Charles from SoulTracks "blessed with some of the most powerful of pipes in her generation, Kelly Price is a singer and songwriter who has combined equal measure of gospel fervor and relatable authenticity since her 1998 debut. No matter what medium she's delivering in live or Memorex the clarity and conviction poured into Kelly's performances are enough to make the listener want to run down an aisle ("He Proposed"), shout His praises ("This Is Who I Am") or throw a temper tantrum ("Tired") all at the same time, which is why Sing Pray Love, Vol. 1: Sing is such an appropriate title for her seventh studio release."

Commercial performance
The album debuted at number 64 on the US Billboard 200 chart, number 6 on the Billboard R&B Albums, number 12 on the US Independent Albums chart and number 10 on the US Top R&B/Hip-Hop Albums chart on June 21, 2014.

Track listing

Credits and personnel
Performers and musicians
Kelly Price – Vocals, Background
Ruben Studdard – Vocals (track 3)
Algebra Blessett – Vocals (track 9)

Technical personnel

Kelly Price – Producer 
Phillip "P3" Scott III – Producer, Instruments
Anthony "Shep" Crawford – Producer, Instruments
Isabel Evans – A&R
Danielle Brimm – A&R
Andrew Kelley – Art Direction
Julia Sutowski – Coordinator, Production
Paul Grosso – Creative Director
Deborah Rigaud – eOne
Esq – eOne
Jeffery Rolle – Management
Brendan Laezza – Management, Digital Marketing
Chris Herche – Management, Digital Marketing
Dontay Thompson – Management, Radio Promo
Maurice White – Management, Radio Promo
Marleny Dominguez – Management, VP Of Urban
James Cruz – Mastering
Peter Mokran – Mixing
Stevier – Photography
Shawnte Crespo – Production Senior Manager
Victor Morante – Production Direction Manager
John McDonald – Production Senior Manager

Charts

Release history

References

2014 albums
Kelly Price albums